Franz Lorette (15 June 1935 – 21 April 2016) was a Belgian field hockey player. He competed at the 1956 Summer Olympics, the 1960 Summer Olympics and the 1964 Summer Olympics.

References

External links
 

1935 births
2016 deaths
Belgian male field hockey players
Olympic field hockey players of Belgium
Field hockey players at the 1956 Summer Olympics
Field hockey players at the 1960 Summer Olympics
Field hockey players at the 1964 Summer Olympics
People from Molenbeek-Saint-Jean
Field hockey players from Brussels